Bishwanath Das (8 March 1889 – 2 June 1984) was a politician, lawyer and philanthropist from India. He was the prime minister of Odisha Province of British India 1937–39, the governor of Uttar Pradesh 1962–67 and later the chief minister of Odisha 1971–72.

Early life 
He was born on 8 March 1889 at Belgan village in Ganjam District of the erstwhile Madras Presidency, which is in the state of Odisha. He graduated from Ravenshaw College, Cuttack.

Political career
Bishwanath Das supported the Indian independence movement from both Odisha and Uttar Pradesh. He was a member of the legislative council of Madras Province from 1921 to 1930. He was instrumental in the creation of a separate state for the Odia-speaking people. After the separation of Odisha on 1 April 1936, he became its prime minister (premier) on 19 July 1937. He became a member of the Constituent Assembly of India in 1946 representing Orissa. He served as the governor of Uttar Pradesh from 16 April 1962 to 30 April 1967. In 1966, he was made the president of Servants of the People Society (Lok Sevak Mandal founded by Lala Lajpat Rai). After the Odisha Vidhan Sabha election in 1971, the Utkal Congress, the Swatantra Party and the Jharkhand Party formed a United Front and he became the chief minister of the United Front government, in Odisha. He was in office from 3 April 1971 to 14 June 1972.

References

External links
 A short biography by Gurukalyan Mahapatra in the Orissa Review, January 2006.
About Shri Bishwanath Das, Governor of Uttar Pradesh.
Allahabad High Court By Justice Shiva Nath Katju.

1889 births
1984 deaths
Chief Ministers of Odisha
People from Odisha
Members of the Constituent Assembly of India
Ravenshaw University alumni
University of Calcutta alumni
Members of the Odisha Legislative Assembly
Governors of Uttar Pradesh
Rajya Sabha members from Odisha
People from Ganjam district